Objective may refer to:
 Objective (optics), an element in a camera or microscope
 The Objective, a 2008 science fiction horror film
 Objective pronoun, a personal pronoun that is used as a grammatical object
 Objective Productions, a British television production company
 Goal, a result or possible outcome that a person or a system desires

See also 
 
 Object (disambiguation)
 Objectivity (disambiguation)
 Objective-C, a general-purpose, object-oriented programming language
 Subjective (disambiguation)